The 2005 Island Games in the Shetland Islands was the 9th edition in which a men's football (soccer) tournament was played at the multi-games competition. It was contested by 10 teams.

The Shetland Islands won the tournament for the first time.

Participants

 Isle of Man

Group phase

Group 1

Group 2

Placement play-off matches

9th place match

7th place match

5th place match

3rd place match

Final

Final rankings

Top goalscorers

4 goals
  Peter Langridge
  Johnny Myers
 Martti Pukk

3 goals
 Scott MacIver

 John Montgomery
 Gordon Morrison
 Paul Murray
 Salomon Thomassen
 Calum Morrissey
 Leighton Flaws
 Erik Thomson

External links
Official 2005 website

2005
2005
2005–06 in European football
2005–06 in Scottish football
Men